Maverick is the seventh studio album by Japanese electropop singer-songwriter Meg, released in Japan on 23 June 2010. This was her last original studio effort with Yasutaka Nakata as producer. Released in Japan on June 23, 2010, it peaked at number 20 on the Oricon chart in its chart debut, and stayed on the chart for four weeks in total. One single was released from the album, Secret Adventure. Released on April 28, 2010, it reached number 44 on the Oricon chart, where it charted for two weeks.

Track listing
All song titles are originally written in capital letters and are all romanized. All lyrics by Meg, all compositions and arrangements by Yasutaka Nakata.
 "N07B" (N-zero-nana-B)
 "Gray"
 "Destination"
 "Hanabi" (花火) (Fireworks)
 "Moshimo" (もしも) (if)
 "Groovy"
 "You"
 "Secret Adventure"
 "Our Space"
 "Story"
 "Maverick"

References

2010 albums
Meg (singer) albums
Universal J albums
Albums produced by Yasutaka Nakata